Les failles is the second studio album by French singer Pomme, released on November 1, 2019 through Polydor Records. The album was produced by Pomme and Albin de la Simone and the lyrics were all written by Pomme.

Promotion

Pomme presented Les failles in the radio broadcasting program Popopop! of France Inter, on October 29, 2019, where she performed the song "Je sais pas danser". In the program, Pomme announced a tour throughout France starting in January 2020.

On August 30, "Je sais pas danser" was released as the first single of Les failles. A month later, "Anxiété" was released as the second single of the album.

Critical reception

Les failles received critical acclaim. Le Devoir's Sylvain Cormier said "this second album of the most [...] is of a sober elegance, of an exquisite taste in restraint". Addict Culture's Camille Locatelli said that the album is "sort of sensitive diary that she reveals with modesty and poetry", adding that "it's an intriguing mix of chanson française and dream folk", and concluded that "Les failles is a jewel burning with truth, to listen by the fireside or in the dark. Perfect for rocking your fall, so".

Track listing

Personnel
Credits adapted from Les failles liner notes.

Musicians

 Pomme – lead vocals, arrangements, piano (track 1, 3), acoustic guitar (track 2, 4, 6, 8, 10), synthesizer (track 9)
François Poggio – guitar (track 1), electric guitar (all tracks except 5, 9, 11)
Albin de la Simone – arrangements, drum programming (track 1), synthesizer programming (track 1, 3), synthesizer (track 4, 7, 8), bass guitar (track 2, 6), piano (track 2, 6, 7, 10), organ (track 6, 7)
Raphael Chassin – drums (track 1, 4), percussion (track 2, 3, 6, 7, 8, 10) 
Renée Largeron – vocals (track 10)

Design

Ambivalently Yours – illustration, graphic design

Production

 Albin de la Simone – production
 Pomme – production
 Ghyslain-Luc Lavigne – mixing, engineering

Recording

 Recorded at a personal studio

Charts

Weekly charts

Year-end charts

References

2019 albums
Pomme (singer) albums